Fox-1A, AO-85 or AMSAT OSCAR 85 is an American amateur radio satellite. It is a 1U Cubesat, was built by the AMSAT-NA and carries a single-channel transponder for FM radio. To enable a satellite launch under NASA's Educational Launch of Nanosatellites (ELaNa) program, the satellite continues to carry a Penn State University student experiment (MEMS gyroscope).

According to AMSAT-NA, Fox-1A will replace OSCAR 51. Upon successful launch, the satellite was assigned OSCAR number 85.

Launch and mission
The satellite was launched on 8 October 2015 with an Atlas V rocket together with the main payload Intruder 11A (also known as NOSS-3 7A, USA 264 and NROL 55) and 12 other Cubesat satellites (SNaP-3 ALICE, SNaP-3 EDDIE, SNaP-3 JIMI, LMRSTSat, SINOD-D 1, SINOD-D 3, AeroCube 5C, OCSD A, ARC 1, BisonSat, PropCube 1 and PropCube 3) from Vandenberg Air Force Base, California, United States. After just a few hours, the transponder was put into operation, initial connections were made between amateur radio stations and telemetry was received.

Status 
Since December 2018, AO-85 has suffered from dangerously low battery voltage while in eclipse. As a result, AMSAT have disabled all on board transmitters in an effort to extend the usable life of the satellite. Transmitters are periodically turned back on to collect telemetry data.

See also

 OSCAR

References

External links
 www.amsat.org  (PDF)

Satellites orbiting Earth
Amateur radio satellites
Spacecraft launched in 2015